Anomalon cruentatum is a species of parasitoid wasps belonging to the family Ichneumonidae.

Description
Body is mainly black in males, while in females head and thorax are reddish (hence the species name cruentatum, meaning bloody). Abdomen is slender and propodeum is reticulated. Clypeus is rounded at apex. A rugose area is present in the notauli. Antennae are black. Legs are yellowish brown, with a white base of hind tibia. These wasps are koinobiont endoparasitoids of larvae of Tenebrionidae or moths in the superfamily Noctuoidea. Reported host species are Agrotis ipsilon, Gonocephalum rusticum, Cerura palestinensis, and Ptilodon capucina.

Distribution and habitat
These wasps are present in most of Europe, in the Near East, in North Africa, and in the Oriental realm. They mainly occur in dry habitats.

References

Ichneumonidae
Insects described in 1785